is a Japanese actor, voice actor and singer from Nagoya, Aichi Prefecture. He is best known for his role as Daisuke Kazama, also known as Kamen Rider Drake, in Kamen Rider Kabuto and Keigo Atobe in The Prince of Tennis musicals. In 2011, he formed a band called Joker and their first single debuted on December 7, 2011.

Filmography

Drama 
 Kamen Rider Kabuto as Daisuke Kazama/Kamen Rider Drake
 Jigoku Shoujo as Ichimoku Ren
 Hotaru no Hikari as Teshima Makoto
 Cafe 吉祥寺で (2008)
 Indigo no yoru (2010)

Film 
 Kamen Rider Kabuto: God Speed Love as Daisuke Kazama/Kamen Rider Drake
 Kamen Rider The Next as Shiro Kazami/Kamen Rider V3
 The Monster X Strikes Back/Attack the G8 Summit
 Kamigakari (2008)
 ＨａＰＰＹダーツ (2008)
 Neko Rahmen Taisho (2008)
 Koikyokusei (2009)
 Wangan Midnight (2009) as Tatsuya Shima
 Sanada 10 Braves (2016)
 Kaitō Queen wa Circus ga Osuki (2022) as Joker

Theatre 
 The Imperial Match Hyotei as Keigo Atobe
 The Imperial Match Hyoutei in Winter as Keigo Atobe
 Dream Live 3rd as Keigo Atobe
 Advancement Match Rokkaku feat. Hyotei Gakuen as Keigo Atobe
 Dream Live 4th (Video Performance） as Keigo Atobe)
 bambino+（Video Performance）as Nazo no otoko（The secret man）
 babino2 (due) as Aoyama Ryuichi
 The Imperial Presence Hyoutei Gakuen feat. Higa Chuu as Keigo Atobe
 Senbonzakura (Musical) as Kaito
 Romeo and Juliet (2014 Musical) as Tybalt
 Lady Bess (2014 Musical) as Robin Blake

Anime 
 Katekyo Hitman Reborn! (2006) as Kikyo
 Gifū Dōdō!! Kanetsugu to Keiji (2013) as Mitsunari Ishida
 B-Project: Kodou*Ambitious (2016) as Kento Aizome
 Ikemen Sengoku: Toki o Kakeru Koi wa Hajimaranai (2017) as Date Masamune
 Kaito x Ansa (2017) as Kaito Aen
 B-Project: Zecchou*Emotion (2019) as Kento Aizome

Video games 
 Ikemen Sengoku: Romances Across Time (2015) as Date Masamune
 B-Project: Muteki*Dangerous (2016) as Kento Aizome
 B-Project: Kaikan*Everyday (2019) as Kento Aizome
 Disney: Twisted-Wonderland (2020) as Malleus Draconia
 Ikemen Prince: The Last Love of Beauty and the Beast (2020) as Leon Dompteur
 The Caligula Effect 2 (2021) as Doctor

Dubbing 
 S.W.A.T. as Sergeant II David "Deacon" Kay (Jay Harrington)

Internet 
 Hitomebore short drama CM

Drama CD 
 Ikemen Sengoku: Romances Across Time as Date Masamune

DVD 
 55mm
 Shinrei Shashin Kitan
 Kazuki Kato Live "GIG" 2006
 Kazuki Kato 1st Anniversary Special Live "GIG" 2007
 Kato Kazuki 3rd ANNIVERSARY SPECIAL LIVE "GIG" 2009 ~Shining Road~
 Live "GIG" Tour 2014 ~Sing A Song Fighter~in Zepp DiverCity Tokyo

Discography

Singles 
  – October 18, 2006
  – February 7, 2007
 "Instinctive Love" – July 25, 2007
 "Impure Love" – October 3, 2007
 "Venom" – March 4, 2009
 "Easy Go" – June 10, 2009
  – March 17, 2010
  – July 28, 2010
 "Kiseki" – April 24, 2013
 "Legend Is Born" – June 4, 2014
 "snowdrop" – December 3, 2014
 "Haru Koi/Yumeoibito" – April 20, 2016
 "Natsu Koi/Aki Koi" – September 28, 2016
 "Fuyu Koi" – January 18, 2017

Albums 
 Rough Diamond – April 26, 2006
 Face – April 4, 2007
 In Love – January 23, 2008
 Glamorous Beat – July 15, 2009
 TOY BOX – November 20, 2013
 EXCITING BOX – April 29, 2015
 SPICY BOX – October 18, 2017
 Ultra Worker – July 18, 2018
 Addicted BOX – June 10, 2020

Other 
  – December 19, 2005
  – January 30, 2008
 Track 6: 
 
 Track 8: 
 Katekyō Hitman Reborn! Concert Rebocon 4: Blue

Photobook 
 Voyage
 Kato Kazuki Artist Book SINGER-Rough Diamond-
 Kato Kazuki 1st Anniversary Book BREAK!

Radio 
 MabeRadio with Kenta Kamakari and Chieko Higuchi

References

External links 
 Official blog 
  
 
 

1984 births
Living people
Avex Group artists
Japanese male video game actors
Japanese male voice actors
Male voice actors from Nagoya
Musicians from Aichi Prefecture
Pony Canyon artists
21st-century Japanese male actors
21st-century Japanese singers
21st-century Japanese male singers